Louisiana Technical College (LTC) was an institute for professional technical education in the state of Louisiana, with campuses across the state.  Louisiana Technical College had no affiliation to Louisiana Tech University.

History

Originally known as "Trade Schools", Louisiana's technical colleges began with the establishment of the first campus in Bogalusa in November 1930. Funding for the school was provided by local sawmill workers, school children, and other citizens in response to their desire to expand course offerings through the Bogalusa School System to include a "manual arts" training department. Initially, training was provided in woodworking and automobile mechanics.

In 1936 a second school came into existence in Shreveport. Campuses were then expanded to a total of five schools with passage of the Louisiana Legislative Act 14 in 1938. Schools were constructed in Winnfield, Crowley, Lake Charles, Opelousas, and Natchitoches. Two schools in Monroe were added in the early 1940s as the result of the War Production Training Program. Louisiana Legislative Act 109 passed in 1942 authorized a tenth school in the statewide system to be built in Cottonport. This campus, Avoyelles Campus, was not completed until after World War II in 1947.

Programs on the Bogalusa campus and the other nine campuses expanded during mid to late 1930s and early 1940s. By 1945, ten different programs were offered, including: automobile mechanics, carpentry, commerce (business office), electricity, machine shop, mechanical drawing, radio, refrigeration and air conditioning, sheet metal, and welding. In 2016 the LTC campuses offered approximately 75 training programs offering a diploma under 16 major occupational areas from carpentry to computer networking. Additional, the LTC provided training which lead to an Associate of Applied Technology Degree in 38 programs under thirteen major occupational areas from practical nursing to pulp and paper technology. Throughout the years, the building and expansion of the number of technical college campuses has increased the number of Louisiana citizens served by occupational education, enabling them to be prepared and receive training for high demand, skilled jobs.

As the result of passing the Vocational Education Act of 1946, the building of technical campuses continued. Between 1950 and 1957, a total of 17 additional schools were constructed, bringing the cumulative total of state-operated post-secondary technical schools to 27.

Between 1958 and 1973, the pace for expansion slowed considerably, with only six additional schools constructed. The pace again increased with passage of Acts 208 and 209 of the Louisiana Legislature in 1973. Act 208 provided for comprehensive statewide structure of career education from elementary through post-secondary levels of education. From 1974 to 1987, the total number of technical campuses grew by an additional 22 campuses. The legislation also led to the consolidation of historically black technical schools with other technical institutions in Opelousas, Monroe, and Natchitoches. The net effect of these changes was a statewide organization of post-secondary technical training involving 53 campuses.

Since the late 1980s there has been a decrease in the number of post-secondary state-operated technical institutions. Currently, there are 40 technical campuses.

Transition to Louisiana Community & Technical College System 
The Louisiana Community and Technical College System (LCTCS) was created in 1999 to bring together into one governance body almost all of the state's community and technical colleges. The LCTCS was created by Act 151 of the 1998 First Extraordinary Session. Management of the LTC was transferred from BESE to the LCTCS Board of Supervisors in 1999.

2008 shooting 
On the morning of February 8, 2008, Latina Williams, a 23-year-old nursing student, opened fire six rounds with a .357 revolver in a second-floor classroom at the Baton Rouge campus of LTC before turning the gun on herself and committing suicide. The two victims were Karsheika Graves (21) and Taneshia Butler (26), who were both fatally shot.

2006 Dissolution of the LTC 
Act 506 of the 2005 Louisiana Regular Session required that the LTC be reorganized with March 2006 deadline for implementation. Changes to the LTC were approved at the March 7, 2006 LCTCS Board of Supervisors Meeting. On July 1, 2006, the Louisiana Technical College ceased to exist as a single entity. The campuses of the LTC were realigned into new colleges. These included Arcadiana Technical College, Capital Area Technical College, Central Louisiana Technical College, Northshore Technical College, Northeast Louisiana Technical College, Northwest Louisiana Technical College, and South Central Louisiana Technical College. The new colleges operated under the LTC name until 2012.

National Alternative Fuels Training Consortium 

This College was a NAFTC's Training Center.

Campus locations 
Region 1 Campuses

Orleans Regional Technical Institute merged with Delgado Community College on July 1, 1997

On August 15, 2010, Louisiana Technical College's Region 1 become part of Delgado Community College's Technical Division.

Region 2 Campuses

Capital Area Technical College's five campuses were merged with Baton Rouge Community College (BRCC).

Region 3 Campuses

On July 1, 2018, SCLTC was abolished and the campuses transferred to several state community colleges.

Region 4 Campuses

On July 1, 2012, Acadiana Technical College (ATC) was merged with South Louisiana Technical Community College.

Region 6 Campuses 

On July 1, 2018, the Oakdale campus was transferred to SOWELA Technical Community College.

On January 1, 2013, Central Louisiana Technical College (CLTC) became Central Louisiana Technical Community College (CLTCC).

Region 7 Campuses

On July 1, 2018, the Natchitoches and Sabine Valley campuses were transferred to Central Louisiana Technical Community College (CLTCC).

On July 1, 2019, Northwest Louisiana Technical College (NLTC) became Northwest Louisiana Technical Community College (NLTCC)

 
Region 8 Campuses

In July 2010 the Tallulah and Lake Providence campuses merged with Louisiana Delta Community College (LDCC).

In July 2012 the Bastrop, Farmerville, Ruston, West Monroe, and Winnsboro campuses merged with Louisiana Delta Community College (LDCC).

Region 9 Campuses

On January 1, 2012, Northshore Technical College (NTC) became Northshore Technical Community College (NTCC).

See also 
List of colleges and universities in Louisiana

References

External links 
 CLTCC Webpage
 Louisiana Community & Technical College System

Universities and colleges in Baton Rouge, Louisiana
Universities and colleges in Shreveport, Louisiana
Education in Winn Parish, Louisiana
Education in East Feliciana Parish, Louisiana
Education in West Baton Rouge Parish, Louisiana
Education in Lafourche Parish, Louisiana
Education in St. John the Baptist Parish, Louisiana
Education in St. Martin Parish, Louisiana
Education in St. Mary Parish, Louisiana
Education in Acadia Parish, Louisiana
Education in Evangeline Parish, Louisiana
Education in Vermilion Parish, Louisiana
Education in Lafayette Parish, Louisiana
Education in Iberia Parish, Louisiana
Education in St. Landry Parish, Louisiana
Education in Rapides Parish, Louisiana
Education in LaSalle Parish, Louisiana
Education in Vernon Parish, Louisiana
Education in Allen Parish, Louisiana
Education in Concordia Parish, Louisiana
Education in Avoyelles Parish, Louisiana
Education in DeSoto Parish, Louisiana
Education in Natchitoches Parish, Louisiana
Education in Webster Parish, Louisiana
Education in Sabine Parish, Louisiana
Education in Morehouse Parish, Louisiana
Education in Ouachita Parish, Louisiana
Education in Union Parish, Louisiana
Education in Franklin Parish, Louisiana
Education in Lincoln Parish, Louisiana
Education in Washington Parish, Louisiana
Education in St. Helena Parish, Louisiana
Education in Tangipahoa Parish, Louisiana
Education in St. Tammany Parish, Louisiana
Public universities and colleges in Louisiana
Defunct universities and colleges in Louisiana